1. FC Union Solingen was a German association football club from Solingen, North Rhine-Westphalia.

History

The club was founded in 1990 in the aftermath of the bankruptcy of SG Union Solingen by former members of that club. 1. FC Union Solingen also failed and was dissolved in 2012 with OFC Solingen and BSC Union Solingen emerging as successors.

Both sides lay claim to the tradition of the earliest club named Union Solingen, founded in 1897 out of the merger of a number of clubs from the district of Ohligs in Solingen. Over time these would include Ohligs FC 06, VfR Ohligs, Walder Ballspielverein, and BV Adler Ohligs. Of these clubs, only VfR Ohligs would distinguish itself with any time spent in first division football when they played the 1940–41 season in the Gauliga Niederrhein before being relegated after a last place result.

Former coaches 
 Frank Zilles (2007–2009)
 Harald Becker (2007)
 Eddy Malura (2006–2007)
 Sven Demandt (2003–2006)
 Bernd Klotz (2002–2003)
 Olaf Rosenthal (2000–2002)
 Gerd Zewe (1999–2000)

Former players 
 Dennis Malura
 Babacar N'Diaye

Honours 
 Verbandsliga Niederrhein 
 Champions: 1994, 2002
 Landesliga Niederrhein 
 Champions: 2000

References

External links 
 The Abseits Guide to German Soccer

 
Defunct football clubs in Germany
Defunct football clubs in North Rhine-Westphalia
Association football clubs established in 1990
1990 establishments in Germany
Association football clubs disestablished in 2012
2012 disestablishments in Germany
Football clubs in Germany